The Iran, North Korea, Syria Nonproliferation Act (INKSNA), also known as the Iran Nonproliferation Act of 2000, is an act of the 109th United States Congress.

The act was first called the Iran Nonproliferation Act. In 2005, Syria was added, and in 2006, North Korea. The act was then called the Iran, North Korea, Syria, Nonproliferation Act. Several companies are sanctioned under the INKSNA act.

Waivers of the provisions of this act have been required to allow NASA to purchase launch services from Russia, in order to support its crewed space program in the period of some years between the retirement of the Space Shuttle and the availability of its successor.

References

External links
 Text of the act

Acts of the 109th United States Congress
United States foreign relations legislation
Iran–United States relations
North Korea–United States relations
Syria–United States relations
United States sanctions
Sanctions against Iran
Sanctions legislation
Nuclear program of Iran
Nuclear program of North Korea